The Standard Grand is a 2017 novel by American poet and novelist Jay Baron Nicorvo.

The Standard Grand was picked for IndieBound's Indie Next List, Library Journal'''s Debut Novels Great First Acts, Poets & Writers's "New and Noteworthy," and was named a best book of the year by The Brooklyn Rail''.

References 

2017 American novels
St. Martin's Press books